"Welcome to Your Authentic Indian Experience™" is a short story written by Rebecca Roanhorse and published in the August 2017 issue of Apex Magazine.  The story was well-received, and it won the 2017 Nebula and the 2018 Hugo short story awards.  Her first professionally published work of speculative fiction, the story also earned Roanhorse the John W. Campbell Award for Best New Writer.

See also 
 List of joint winners of the Hugo and Nebula awards

References

External links 
 "Welcome to Your Authentic Indian Experience™" at Apex Magazine

2017 short stories
Hugo Award for Best Short Story winning works
Nebula Award for Best Short Story-winning works
Works originally published in online magazines